Pedro Diez Canseco Corbacho (January 31, 1815 in Arequipa, Peru – April 3, 1893 in Chorrillos, Peru) was a Peruvian soldier and politician who served as President of Peru in 1863 and again in 1868; he also served as Interim President of Peru in 1865. He served as the second vice president from October 1862 to 1863. He was the brother of Francisco Diez Canseco, and a great-grandfather of Fernando Belaunde Terry.

References

See also
 List of presidents of Peru

1815 births
1893 deaths
People from Arequipa
Presidents of Peru
Vice presidents of Peru
People of the Chincha Islands War
Freemasons